Fiorentino is an Italian surname and a masculine given name. Notable people with the name include:

Surname 
Adriano Fiorentino (1440–1499), also known as Adriano di Giovanni De' Maestri, was an Italian medallist and sculptor
Daniele Fiorentino (born 1988), Italian professional football player
Francesco Fiorentino (philosopher) (1834–1884), Italian philosopher and historiographer 
Giosuè Fiorentino (1898–1977), Italian politician
Giovanni Fiorentino, 14th-century Florentine writer
Imero Fiorentino (1928–2013), American lighting designer
James Fiorentino' American painter and illustrator
Joe Fiorentino, Martial Arts Champion, Ellis Island Medal of Honor
Jon Paul Fiorentino, Canadian poet, novelist, short story writer, editor, and professor
Linda Fiorentino (born Clorinda Fiorentino), American film and television actress 
Melissa Fiorentino, American female boxer
Nicole Fiorentino, American bass guitarist
Peter Fiorentino (1968), Canadian retired professional ice hockey defenceman
Rosso Fiorentino, (the Red Florentine), Italian Mannerist painter 
Sergio Fiorentino, Italian classical pianist
Stefano Fiorentino (1301–1350), Italian painter of the time of Giotto
Tony Fiorentino, American television color commentator

Given name 
Fiorentino Sullo (1921–2000), Italian politician 

Italian-language surnames
Italian masculine given names
Italian toponymic surnames